George Banda (born 3 March 1992) is a Zimbabwean cricketer who has played in two List A matches. He was included in Zimbabwe's squad for the 2016 Africa T20 Cup and made his Twenty20 debut for Zimbabwe against Free State on 9 September 2016.

References

External links
 

1992 births
Living people
Zimbabwean cricketers
Southern Rocks cricketers
Sportspeople from Masvingo